David Scott (born 11 February 1988), also known by his stagename The Kiffness, is a South African musician, producer and parody artist who is the founder and lead singer for the band The Kiffness. Despite the name of the band, Scott is referred to as The Kiffness alone.

Early life and career 
In 2004, Scott was a member of the KwaZulu-Natal Youth Choir. Scott was educated at Michaelhouse school and went to the University of the Witwatersrand to study medicine. However, he dropped out and switched to studying music and philosophy at Rhodes University while working as a DJ and playing in a jazz band. In 2013, he released his first single "Where are You Going?" with Matthew Gold, which made the 5FM Top 40. Their album Kiff was nominated at the 21st South African Music Awards in 2015 and again in 2017. He usually performs wearing a floral custom suit that he had made in Hội An, Vietnam, with a material selected by his wife and himself as it resembled his grandmother's curtains.

Scott creates satirical songs that are mostly aimed at South African political issues. In 2017, he released a song called "White Privilege" as an attempt to make white South Africans more socially aware. In 2018, he filmed a video for his Afrikaans song "Pragtig Meisie" with a picture of the Afrikaner nationalist singer Steve Hofmeyr's face on a blow-up doll.

In 2019, Scott banned the South African Broadcasting Corporation from playing his music when it emerged they had not been paying musicians for playing their songs and he alleged he was owed R60,000. In the same year, he embarked upon a solo career. In 2020, The Kiffness parodied the national anthem of South Africa for a song called "Nkosazan' Dlamini Trafficker" as part of a criticism of Minister Nkosazana Dlamini-Zuma's ban on the sale of cigarettes in South Africa during the COVID-19 lockdown. The Ekurhuleni mayor Mzwandile Masina criticised him for doing it to the anthem claiming it was "racist". Scott and Masina later discussed it over the phone with Scott defending it as satire. He also wrote other lockdown parody songs and created a parody of "Jerusalema" aimed at the Economic Freedom Fighters leader Julius Malema following EFF activists attacking Clicks shops over a shampoo advertisement which they considered racist.

In late 2020, he collaborated with the Turkish musician Bilal Göregen in creating a remix of Göregen's rendition of "Ievan polkka" that went viral on YouTube. In 2021, he created a song parodying Miriam Makeba's "The Click Song" to assist people with pronouncing the new names of Port Elizabeth, King William's Town and Maclear after the South African government changed them.

Activism 
During the 2022 Russian invasion of Ukraine, Scott supported Ukraine by remixing the Ukrainian folk song "Oh, the Red Viburnum in the Meadow" performed by Boombox frontman Andriy Khlyvnyuk. The latter cancelled his American tour to defend his country against the invasion by Russian Armed Forces. Royalties from this remix will be donated to humanitarian aid for the Armed Forces of Ukraine.

References

External links 
 

Living people
Year of birth missing (living people)
South African musicians
University of the Witwatersrand alumni
Rhodes University alumni
South African YouTubers
White South African people
Parody musicians
South African parodists
South African electronic musicians
Musicians from Cape Town
South African producers
Alumni of Michaelhouse